The Exit Control Lists (ECL) is a system of border control maintained by the Government of Pakistan under Exit from Pakistan (Control) Ordinance, 1981. The people on the list are prohibited from leaving Pakistan.

Priorities
1. Exit from Pakistan (Control) Ordinance, 1981, empowers the Federal Government to prohibit any person from proceeding abroad. Ordinarily, the following categories of persons are placed on ECL:-
(a) Persons involved in mass corruption and misuse of power/authority causing loss to the government funds/property.
(b) Government employees involved in economic crime where large government funds have been embezzled or institutional frauds committed.
(c) Hardened criminals involved in acts of terrorism and conspiracy.
(d) Key directors of firms having tax default / liabilities of Rs. 10 million or more.
(e) Only 2 -3 key directors of firms having more than Rs. 100 million loan default / liabilities.
(f) Names of persons if recommended by the Registrar, High Courts of Pakistan / Supreme Court of Pakistan and Banking Courts only.
(g) Drug traffickers.

2. The on-line system is operational at the ministry linked with international airports at Karachi, Lahore, Peshawar, Islamabad and Faisalabad.

3. Any person aggrieved by the order of the federal government regarding placement of his or her name on the ECL, can under the law, file a review petition giving justifications for review and also can seek a personal hearing with the competent authority.

4. The ECL is reviewed periodically to assess the need for further retention of a person on the ECL.

Pakistan's Federal Investigation Agency (FIA) was responsible for control of the Exit Control List but now this responsibility has been shifted to the Ministry of Interior and thus avoiding the previously experienced complications in this regard.

Controversies 
In 2018, the government and Tehreek-e-Labbaik Pakistan (TLP) reached an agreement after which the latter ended its three-day-long nationwide protests against the Supreme Court of Pakistan's acquittal of Asia Bibi who had been sentenced to death in 2010 for blasphemy.

One of the points both parties agreed on was that the government would "initiate the legal process" to place Bibi's name on the Exit Control List.

After Bibi's acquittal on October 31, the Tehreek-e-Labbaik Pakistan (TLP) ordered their followers to protest and begin sit-ins across the country. The protests turned violent and saw destruction and vandalism of private property. However, the government stated that unless a person is declared a criminal, or there is another legal basis for action, the question of placing an individual's name on the ECL would not arise.

References

Human rights abuses in Pakistan
Law of Pakistan
1981 in law
Pakistan federal departments and agencies